The Hazardous Substances and New Organisms Act (HSNO) is an Act of Parliament passed in New Zealand in 1996. The New Zealand Environmental Protection Authority (EPA) administers the Act.

External links 
 Text of the Act
 Hazardous Substances and New Organisms  at the Ministry of Environment
 Environmental Protection Authority (EPA New Zealand)

Statutes of New Zealand
Environmental law in New Zealand
1996 in New Zealand law
1996 in the environment
Hazardous materials